Beaujon may refer to:

People 
Aletta Beaujon (1933–2001), Dutch poet and psychologist
Antony Beaujon ( 1762–1805), Dutch and British colonial administrator
Nicolas Beaujon (1718–1786), French banker
Otto Beaujon (1915–1984), Prime Minister of the Netherlands Antilles

Other 
Beaujon Aircraft, an American aircraft design company
Beaujon Hospital, a hospital in Clichy, Paris, France